Zoran Baldovaliev (born 4 March 1983) is a Macedonian footballer who plays as a forward for Tikvesh Kavadarci.

Club career
Baldovaliev started his career in the Macedonian club Belasica, and played for the Macedonian national team between 2002 and 2003. He subsequently played for the Slovenian club Publikum in 2003, for the Azerbaijanian club MKT Araz Imisli between 2003 and 2005, and for the Latvian champion Ventspils for six months in 2006.

In June 2007 he signed with the Bulgarian club Lokomotiv Sofia.

In 2010, Baldovaliev was bought by Israeli side Hapoel Ironi Kiryat Shmona, which he helped obtain a spot in the first tier of Israeli football after in his first season there.  He joined Cypriot club Enosis on 30 January 2011, but was released after the end of the season.

On 5 September 2011, he joined Saudi Professional League side Najran on a one-year plus an option year contract. In early January, he was released by Najran and moved to another Saudi Arabian team Al-Qadisiyah.

On 16 September 2012, Zoran made his debut for Turnovo, scoring a goal in his first game. He has since had a promising start for the club with his experience.

Baldovaliev rejoined his former club Lokomotiv Plovdiv in the summer of 2015.

After a half year at Greece club Giouchtas, Baldovaliev returned to Macedonia and signed with Tikvesh on 8 January 2020.

International career 
He made his senior debut for North Macedonia in a February 2003 friendly match away against Croatia and has earned a total of 4 caps, scoring 1 goal. His final international was an August 2007 friendly match against Liechtenstein.

References

External links
MacedonianFootball.com

1983 births
Living people
Sportspeople from Strumica
Association football forwards
Macedonian footballers
North Macedonia international footballers
FK Belasica players
NK Celje players
FK MKT Araz players
FK Ventspils players
PFC Lokomotiv Plovdiv players
FC Lokomotiv 1929 Sofia players
Hapoel Ironi Kiryat Shmona F.C. players
Enosis Neon Paralimni FC players
Najran SC players
Al-Qadsiah FC players
FK Horizont Turnovo players
PAE Kerkyra players
FC Chiasso players
Olympiacos Volos F.C. players
Akademija Pandev players
FK Tikvesh players
Macedonian First Football League players
Slovenian PrvaLiga players
Azerbaijan Premier League players
Latvian Higher League players
First Professional Football League (Bulgaria) players
Liga Leumit players
Israeli Premier League players
Cypriot First Division players
Saudi Professional League players
Football League (Greece) players
Swiss Challenge League players
Macedonian Second Football League players
Macedonian expatriate footballers
Expatriate footballers in Slovenia
Macedonian expatriate sportspeople in Slovenia
Expatriate footballers in Azerbaijan
Macedonian expatriate sportspeople in Azerbaijan
Expatriate footballers in Latvia
Macedonian expatriate sportspeople in Latvia
Expatriate footballers in Bulgaria
Macedonian expatriate sportspeople in Bulgaria
Expatriate footballers in Israel
Macedonian expatriate sportspeople in Israel
Expatriate footballers in Cyprus
Macedonian expatriate sportspeople in Cyprus
Expatriate footballers in Saudi Arabia
Macedonian expatriate sportspeople in Saudi Arabia
Expatriate footballers in Greece
Macedonian expatriate sportspeople in Greece
Expatriate footballers in Switzerland
Macedonian expatriate sportspeople in Switzerland